Popat (Marathi: पोपट; translation: Parrot) is a Marathi drama film released on 23 August 2013. Produced by Mirah Entertainment Pvt. Ltd and Citrus Check Inns and directed by Satish Rajwade. The film stars Atul Kulkarni, Siddharth Menon, Ketan Pawar, Amey Wagh. The film's music is by Avinash - Vishwajeet.

The film is a journey of young men who explore on the topic of HIV/AIDS and realize that it is not a matter of joke.

Plot
Popat is a movie based in a village, where four friends usually hang out together. One day, they wanted to find out what specialized skills do they possess.

One of them had an experience of being a junior actor, so these guys decide to make a movie on HIV/AIDS. Another one of them owned a camera, which is enough for them to venture onto making their movie. Topic of the movie was chosen as a joke and what they expected to be a rib tickling journey turns out to be one of the most moving experience of their lives.

Cast
 Atul Kulkarni as Janya 
 Siddharth Menon as Balya 
 Amey Wagh as Raghya 
 Ketan Pawar 
 Anita Date-Kelkar
 Neha Shitole

Crew
Director - Aditi Popat
Story - Satish Rajwade
Producer - Mirah Entertainment Pvt. Ltd and Citrus Check Inns
Music Director - Avinash–Vishwajeet
Cinematographer - Samalabhasker

Soundtrack

The songs was composed by Avinash-Vishwajeet with lyrics by Saumitra, Vishwajeet Joshi and Ashwini Shende.

References

External links
 

2013 films
2010s Marathi-language films
HIV/AIDS in Indian films
Films directed by Satish Rajwade